Nevada Health Link is the health insurance marketplace for the U.S. state of Nevada. The exchange enables individuals and small businesses to purchase health insurance at federally subsidized rates.

Background
Health insurance exchanges were established as a part of the 2010 Patient Protection and Affordable Care Act to enable individuals to purchase health insurance in state-run marketplaces. In this legislation, states could choose to establish their own health insurance exchanges; if they choose not to do so, the federal government would run the exchange for the state.

References

External links

 

2010s establishments in Nevada
Nevada law
Government of Nevada
Nevada
Healthcare reform in the United States
United States state health legislation